These are the official results of the Men's 100 metres event at the 1986 European Championships in Stuttgart, West Germany, held at Neckarstadion on 26 and 27 August 1986.

Medalists

Results

Final
27 August
Wind: -0.1 m/s

Semifinals
27 August
Semi-final 1: Wind: 1.5 m/s, Semi-final 2: Wind: 2.1 m/s

Heats
26 August

Heat 1
Wind: -1.5 m/s

Heat 2
Wind: -0.7 m/s

Heat 3
Wind: -0.8 m/s

Heat 4
Wind: -1.6 m/s

Heat 5
Wind: -1.0 m/s

Participation
According to an unofficial count, 33 athletes from 18 countries participated in the event.

 (2)
 (1)
 (2)
 (2)
 (3)
 (1)
 (2)
 (1)
 (1)
 (1)
 (1)
 (2)
 (1)
 (3)
 (3)
 (1)
 (3)
 (3)

See also
 1984 Men's Olympic 100 metres (Los Angeles)
 1987 Men's World Championships 100 metres (Rome)
 1988 Men's Olympic 100 metres (Seoul)

References

 Results

100
100 metres at the European Athletics Championships